Kineta is a beach town in West Attica, Greece. It is part of the municipality Megara.

Geography

Kineta is situated on the northern coast of the Saronic Gulf, south of the Geraneia mountains. The rocks of Kakia Skala lie to the east. The nearest towns are Agioi Theodoroi (8 km to the southwest) and Megara (12 km to the east). Corinth is 25 km to the west, and Athens is 45 km to the east. The old Greek National Road 8 and the new Motorway 8, both connecting Athens with Corinth and the Peloponnese, pass through the town. The Kineta railway station is served by Proastiakos trains between Athens International Airport and Kiato (Peloponnese).

History

The name "Kineta" is said to be taken from a small lagoon or marsh on the beach, which produces such swarms of gnats in the autumn as to almost amount to a plague.

The lagoon does not exist anymore but Kineta still has (2010) more than its share of gnats.

"To the east of Crommyon, at the western extremity of the Scironian rocks, was a temple of Apollo Latous, which marked the boundaries of the Corinthia and Megaris in the time of Pausanias. This temple must have been near the modern village of Kineta, a little above which the road leads over the Scironian rocks to Megara."

"His (Pausanias) Corinthiacs, therefore, open at the western extremity of the Scironides, near a temple of Apollo Latous. Here began a succession of narrow valleys at the foot of the mountains Oneia, extending twelve miles along the shore of the Saronic gulf, as far as the port Schoenous, or eastern extremity of the Isthmus properly so called. All this track appears to have been called Crommyonia. The only place mentioned in it by Pausanias is Crommyon; but we know from other authors, that there was likewise a town or fortress, named Sidus, between Crommyon and the Isthmus. It sufficiently appears, from Thucydides, Strabo, and Pausanias, that Crommyon itself was not far from the Scironides, which, as we have already seen, were the boundary of the Megaris. Near Kineta, a village not far from the western termination of the rocks, which is built like Megara with flat roofs, and is situated in a valley planted with olives, there are some vestiges which indicate that Crommyon occupied nearly the same site. Sidus appears to have been at Kassidhi, midway between Kineta and port Kalamaki, the ancient Schoenus".

On 23 July 2018, a wildfire developed in the area, which burned a few houses in Kineta.

Historical population

Gallery

See also
Communities of Attica

References

Populated places in West Attica
Acropolis Rally